Hytera (previously HYT) is a Chinese publicly traded and partly state-owned manufacturer of radio transceivers and radio systems founded in Shenzhen, Guangdong in 1993. Hytera is listed on the Shenzhen Stock Exchange and is partly owned by Shenzhen Investment Holdings of Shenzhen's municipal government. Hytera is major contributor to the PDT Standard, which is designed for public safety organizations in China. The company is a major supplier to China's Ministry of Public Security.

Locations and subsidiaries
The company's head office is in Shenzhen, China. Hytera's products are developed at three development sites in total. One of the development sites is located in Bad Münder, Germany. In March 2012 Hytera acquired the German company Rohde & Schwarz Professional Mobile Radio GmbH from the German electronics group Rohde & Schwarz, which is now known as Hytera Mobilfunk. In addition, there are Hytera subsidiaries in the US, UK, Canada, and Spain.

United States 
In June 2007, Hytera acquired Marketronics Corporation, now known as Hytera America, Inc., located in Miramar, Florida. In 2019, Hytera and several other Chinese-based companies, including Huawei, were placed on a ban list of the 2019 National Defense Authorization Act (NDAA) to not do any business with U.S. federal agencies due to national security and human rights concerns.

On May 27, 2020, Hytera America and Hytera America (West) filed for Chapter 11 bankruptcy citing ongoing lawsuits brought by Motorola Solutions and the impact of the COVID-19 pandemic.

On January 12, 2021, Hytera US Inc., a new subsidiary of Hytera's in the U.S., set up following the court procedures, officially began to operate its business.

In March 2021, the Federal Communications Commission (FCC) declared that Hytera video surveillance and telecommunications services and equipment "pose an unacceptable risk to U.S. national security.” In November 2022, the FCC banned sales or import of equipment made by Hytera for national security reasons.

Germany 
The German company BICK Mobilfunk GmbH was founded as an engineering firm in 1980 and was absorbed by Rohde & Schwarz as early as in 1988. The company put into service the first TETRA system in Germany. The enterprise primarily deals with the development and implementation of trunked radio systems according to the TETRA standard. In 2011 TETRA division was sold to Hytera Communications Co. Ltd.

Legal disputes with Motorola

The company is the defendant, as well as the plaintiff, in ongoing intellectual property litigation with Motorola Solutions. Hytera is also a plaintiff of an antitrust lawsuit against Motorola Solutions. In February 2022, Hytera was criminally indicted in United States District Court for the Northern District of Illinois under charges of technology theft.

References

External links
 

Manufacturing companies based in Shenzhen
Chinese companies established in 1993
Electronics companies established in 1993
Chinese brands
Telecommunication equipment companies of China
Telecommunications equipment vendors
Companies that filed for Chapter 11 bankruptcy in 2020
Companies listed on the Shenzhen Stock Exchange
Government-owned companies of China